Hylomus rhinoceros is an aposematic species of dragon millipede in the family Paradoxosomatidae. It is only known from Champasak and Sekong Provinces in southern Laos.

It was first described, along with H. rhinoparvus, in 2015. Both species were discovered in Laos, the first dragon millipedes identified there, H. rhinoceros in the south of the country and H. rhinoparvus in the north. The holotype is in the Museum of Zoology, Chulalongkorn University, Bangkok, Thailand.

The color is dark red.

References 

Millipedes of Asia
Arthropods of Laos
Endemic fauna of Laos
Animals described in 2015